Divona (Gaulish: Deuona, Diuona, 'Divine') is a Gallo-Roman goddess of springs and rivers.

The cult of the fresh waters appears to have been particularly important among Gauls, and Celts in general, compared to the other of Indo-European-speaking peoples.

Name
The name Divona ('Divine') is a derivative of the Gaulish word deuos ('god'). Toponymic evidence suggest that sacred springs have been named for the deity, such as Dēouóna (Δηουόνα), the ancient name of Cahors, as well as Divonne and Fosse Dionne.

Attestation and cult practices
In ancient Roman religion, goddesses of freshwater sources are often associated with the deity Fons, god of fountains and wellheads, honored at the Fontinalia for his role in the public water supply for the city. Ausonius invokes fons, the manmade outlet that makes the water available to the people, with a string of adjectives: sacer, alme, perennis, / vitree, glauce, profunde, sonore, illimis, opace, "sacred, life-giving, eternal, / glassy, blue-green, measureless, sonorous, free of mud, shaded." He hails fons as the "Genius of the city" (urbis genius) having the power to offer a healing draught (medico potabilis haustu). In the next line, Ausonius says that this genius or tutelary deity is Divona in the Celtic language (Divona Celtarum lingua), that is, fons added to the divae (plural).

She is hailed (salve, compare Salve Regina) in a Latin poem by Ausonius, the 4th-century Bordelais scholar-poet who was the tutor of the emperor Gratian.

References

Bibliography 
 
 
 
 
 

Gaulish goddesses
Sea and river goddesses
Water goddesses
Gallo-Roman religion